Maud Heath's Causeway is a pathway dating from the 15th century in rural Wiltshire, England. On both sides of its crossing of the River Avon, just west of Kellaways, the path rises above the floodplain on sixty-four brick arches (built 1812, largely reconstructed in the 20th century) alongside an undistinguished country road between Bremhill and Langley Burrell.

The causeway is the gift of the eponymous Maud Heath, who made her living carrying eggs to market at Chippenham. She was a widow and childless, and when she died she left money to improve and maintain the path along which she had tramped to market several times a week for most of her life. Over five hundred years later, the charity still maintains the path out of her bequest.

Since 1960, the raised section has been listed Grade II* on the National Heritage List for England.

A brief guide to the causeway was written by K.R. Clew in 1982.

Monuments

Further up the hill stands Maud Heath's Monument, a statue of the eponymous lady, erected on a high column in 1838 and looking out over the river and its floodplain. The statue, in a bonnet and authentic plebeian clothes from the reign of Edward IV, was erected by Lord Lansdowne, and features a poem by the critic William Lisle Bowles, who was vicar of Bremhill at the time, which reads:

References

External links
 
 Walk: Bremhill and Maud Heath's Causeway – The AA,
 John Edward Jackson: Maud Heath's Causey, Devizes, 1854 – via Internet Archive.

1838 establishments in England
1838 sculptures
Geography of Wiltshire
Grade II* listed buildings in Wiltshire
Grade II* listed monuments and memorials
Grade II* listed public art
Monuments and memorials in Wiltshire
Monuments and memorials to women
Outdoor sculptures in England
Sculptures of women in the United Kingdom
Stone sculptures in the United Kingdom
Statues in England